The 1987 Tennents' Sixes was the fourth staging of the indoor 6-a-side football tournament. For the second time it was held at the Scottish Exhibition and Conference Centre (SECC) in Glasgow on 18 and 19 January.

There were 4 groups of 3,  with all clubs drawn from the 1986–87 Scottish Premier Division season.

The two group winners and runners-up qualified to the quarter-finals and Aberdeen beat Heart of Midlothian 4–3 in the final.

Group stage

Group 1

Group 2

Group 3

Group 4

Quarter-finals

Semi-finals

Final

References

External links
Scottish Football Historical Archive

1986–87 in Scottish football
1980s in Glasgow
Tennents' Sixes
Sports competitions in Glasgow
Football in Glasgow
January 1987 sports events in the United Kingdom